This Is My Song is an LP album released by Columbia Records in 1967 under catalog number CS 9476, containing mostly songs from musical plays and movies.

Track listing

Ray Conniff albums
1967 compilation albums
Columbia Records compilation albums